The 2013 Boyd Tinsley Women's Clay Court Classic was a professional tennis tournament played on outdoor clay courts. It was the twelfth edition of the tournament which was part of the 2013 ITF Women's Circuit, offering a total of $50,000 in prize money. It took place in Charlottesville, Virginia, United States, on April 22–28, 2013.

WTA entrants

Seeds 

 1 Rankings as of April 15, 2013

Other entrants 
The following players received wildcards into the singles main draw:
  Lindsey Hardenbergh
  Allie Kiick
  Ashley Weinhold
  Allie Will

The following players received entry from the qualifying draw:
  Jan Abaza
  Sanaz Marand
  Petra Rampre
  Chalena Scholl

Champions

Singles 

  Shelby Rogers def.  Allie Kiick 6–3, 7–5

Doubles 

  Nicola Slater /  Coco Vandeweghe def.  Nicole Gibbs /  Shelby Rogers 6–3, 7–6(7–4)

External links 
 2013 Boyd Tinsley Women's Clay Court Classic at ITFtennis.com
 

Boyd Tinsley Women's Clay Court Classic
Clay court tennis tournaments
Tennis tournaments in the United States
Boyd Tinsley
2013 in American tennis
Tennis in Virginia